Vineet Alurkar is an Indian musician and singer-songwriter from Pune, India. He is most noteworthy as the frontman of bands The Black Birds and Yoga Logik.

Biography 
Alurkar was born to music entrepreneur Suresh Alurkar and wife Anuradha Alurkar. Alurkar's father was known in music circles across India for his vast collection of rare classics and was the owner of Alurkar Music House. Alurkar's father was found murdered in his Pune home in 2008. Alurkar has one brother and is married as of 2016.

Alurkar conceived of the Austrian-Indian folk rock 6 member band, Yoga Logik in 2005 when he jammed with Austrian guitarist Wolfgang Sambs during Sambs' visit to India. The band's music is inspired by lyrical poetry. Critics have appreciated its blend of contemporary jazz and funk clubbed with Indian classical styles of music. The band have extensively toured Europe and India from 2012–16. The band released an album titled Live at Vidya Valley in 2014.

Alurkar was also one of the founding members of the band The Black Birds in 2011. The band began as a school reunion between Alurkar and fellow musician Dhruv Bhate. The band released an EP that same year.

As of 2016, Alurkar has been performing over 13 years in India and around the globe. Alurkar plays the guitar as his favored instrument and runs his music teaching practice from Aundh in Pune. He is a permanent musical faculty with the Pune based Vidya Valley School and is visiting faculty in Rungsted Gymnasium, a high school in Copenhagen, Denmark.

References

External links

Marathi people
Living people
Singers from Pune
Marathi-language singers
Indian male singers
English-language singers from India
Year of birth missing (living people)